Darra is a 2016 Punjabi film directed by Parveen Kumar, produced by Dalwinder Guraya and starring Gurpreet Ghuggi, Manveer Rai, Happy Raikoti, Kartar Cheema, Shivendra Mahal and Sardar Sohi as the lead cast of the film and was released worldwide on 2 September 2016.

Cast
 Gurpreet Ghuggi - Darra Singh
 Happy Raikoti - Happy
 Kartar Cheema - Kartar Singh
 Shivendra Mahal - Sarpanch Joginder Singh
 Sardar Sohi - Subedar Surjit Singh
 Karamjit Anmol - Common village person
 Rana Ranbir - Village shopkeeper
 Pammi Bai - Paramjit Singh a.k.a. Pammi
 Nirmal Rishi - Mother of Darra, Pammi, and Kartar
 Manpreet Saggu
 Manveer Rai
 Raj Dhaliwal

Soundtrack  
Music by Kuljit Singh.

Reception 
Jasmine Singh of The Tribune opined that "Darra, this week’s Punjabi film release creates history, by being an exclusive movie to run without any storyline - from beginning to the end; well, not even a pinch of it".

References

External links 
 Darra trailer

2016 films
Punjabi-language Indian films
2010s Punjabi-language films